Eiichiro Hamazaki (born 28 June 1973) is a Japanese sailor. He competed in the men's 470 event at the 2000 Summer Olympics.

References

External links
 

1973 births
Living people
Japanese male sailors (sport)
Olympic sailors of Japan
Sailors at the 2000 Summer Olympics – 470
Sportspeople from Tokyo
Asian Games medalists in sailing
Sailors at the 1998 Asian Games
Asian Games silver medalists for Japan
Medalists at the 1998 Asian Games
20th-century Japanese people